Qendër Skrapar is a former municipality in Berat County, central Albania. At the 2015 local government reform it became a subdivision of the municipality Skrapar. The municipal unit surrounds the town Çorovodë. The population at the 2011 census was 2,545.

References

Former municipalities in Berat County
Administrative units of Skrapar
Populated places disestablished in 2015